Stephen A. Ruddy Jr. (May 7, 1901 – January 1, 1964) was an American competition swimmer who represented the United States at the 1920 Summer Olympics in Antwerp, Belgium.  Ruddy competed in the preliminary heats of the men's 200-meter breaststroke and men's 400-meter breaststroke, but did not advance.

References

External links
 

1901 births
1964 deaths
American male breaststroke swimmers
Olympic swimmers of the United States
Sportspeople from New York City
Swimmers at the 1920 Summer Olympics